La señorita Robles y sus hijos is a Mexican telenovela directed by Noé Alcántara for Canal de las Estrellas in 1979.

Lucy Tovar and Mauricio Herrera star as the protagonists, while Carlos Monden star as the antagonist.

Cast 
Mauricio Herrera
Carlos Monden
Jorge Ortiz de Pinedo
Begoña Palacios
Lucy Tovar

References

External links 

Mexican telenovelas
1979 telenovelas
Televisa telenovelas
Spanish-language telenovelas
1979 Mexican television series debuts
1979 Mexican television series endings